The 1949–50 Waterloo Hawks season was their first and only season in the newly formed National Basketball Association.

Roster

|-
! colspan="2" style="background-color: #000000;  color: #FFFF00; text-align: center;" | Waterloo Hawks 1949–50 roster
|- style="background-color: #FFFF00; color: #000000;   text-align: center;"
! Players !! Coaches
|- 
| valign="top" |

! Pos. !! # !! Nat. !! Name !! Ht. !! Wt. !! From
|-

Regular season

Season standings

Record vs. opponents

Game log

References

Waterloo Hawks seasons
Waterloo